Qualified Weapons Instructor (QWI) (queue-why) is a qualification given to graduates of the Royal Air Force or Royal Navy Qualified Weapons Instructor courses. It is the equivalent to the United States Air Force Weapons School Course or US Navy's Naval Strike and Air Warfare Center warfare schools (including TOPGUN).
Graduates of a QWI course are entitled to wear a QWI 'patch' on their flying suit or combat uniform, which denotes their status as an expert practitioner in their warfare specialty or platform.  While QWI, TOPGUN and the United States Air Force Weapons School were traditionally associated with the employment of kinetic weapons and with historical origins in the combat aircraft community, modern warfare experts recognize that kinetic and non-kinetic weapons systems are critical in current and future combat engagements. This is reflected in the expansion of the respective warfare schools over the past two decades Recognizing this, the RAF has recently expanded the QWI qualification to included several non-kinetic fields and now strives to achieve Full Spectrum Warfare through effects based warfare. QWI is not to be confused with QFI Qualified Flying Instructor which is a non-tactical qualification.

Overview
Recognizing that modern warfare requires Effects-based operations and Full-spectrum dominance, the RAF has expanded its QWI programme beyond pure weapons kinetic effects and fighter aircraft tactics. Much like the equivalent weapons and warfare schools in the US, the RAF now qualifies expert level instructors in many fields. 

As of January 2017 the RAF delivers the following courses. 
 QWI - Typhoon/Reaper weapons system tactics and employment 
 QWI (ISR) - non-kinetic and Intelligence, surveillance, target acquisition, and reconnaissance employment and delivery of full spectrum warfare.  

As requirements continue to evolve for the RAF, future courses may be created as requirements dictate.

Applicants to the QWI program are usually at the end of the first or second tour of duty and have operationally demonstrated above average qualities and capabilities in their field and are usually the top performing aircrew or operators in their squadron. 

The course lasts between 7 and 9 months. Selected applicants start their course of study with a Combined Ground School where Student Instructors receive awareness level capabilities briefs on pan-defence subjects, such as platform capabilities and limitations, UK MoD programmes and initiatives, and basic Combined Air Operations (COMAO) tactics. This is followed by 6–8 months of training back at their respective squadrons in the use of the weapons systems specific to their trade. The course culminates in the operational phase, Exercise COBRA WARRIOR (Formerly known as the Combined QWI (CQWI)), where all that they learnt is put into practice and student instructors from each branch must integrate and deliver full spectrum capabilities.  Exercise COBRA WARRIOR is the practical application of the Find, Fix, Track, Target, Engage, Assess (F2T2EA) or Find, Fix, Finish, Exploit, Analyze, Disseminate (F3EAD) killchains requires coordinated efforts among all participants to successfully achieve the commander's objectives. Fast jet QWI plan for kinetic weapons effects (both air-air and air-ground) and once handed a target complete Target, Engage and Assess. QWI (ISR) provides the Find, Fix, Track and Assess portion of the kill chain.  Each morning the QWI students are given an Air Tasking Order (ATO). They then need to plan the appropriate missions required to fulfil the commander's objectives laid out by the ATO and promulgated in higher level tasking documentation. With different types of aircraft and effects and a robust simulated adversary, planning is complex and typically requires an entire day to plan while mission execute only takes 1–2 hours.

All graduates are awarded 'QWI' annotation in the Air Force List and are recognized as experts for their respective platforms and fields through continued merit, professionalism and achievement. At international training events, such as Operation RED FLAG, QWIs are held in the same regard and to the same standard as USAF and USN patch wearers and are often employed in the tactical mentor role both in exercises and in real world operations.

Recognizing a lack of experts in employing ISR weapons systems, in Feb 2010 the RAF introduced an additional QWI course for aircrew of Intelligence Surveillance and Reconnaissance platforms (such as Reaper, Rivet Joint, E-3 Sentry and Sentinel) and Intelligence Officers. This course covers content similar to the Maritime ISR Weapons and Tactics Instructor course run through the Naval Strike and Air Warfare Center US Navy and represents a blend of the Command and Control Operations course (8th Weapons Squadron) and Intelligence Sensor Weapons Instructor Course (19th Weapons Squadron) run by the USAF Weapons School. While traditional QWI focuses on becoming a platform expert and advanced kinetic weapons effects, the QWI (ISR) provides experts in pan-defence non-kinetic and ISR weapons systems.

Pilots of other air forces can attend the school through the Ministry of Defence's International Defence Training Programme.

See also
United States Air Force Weapons School
TOPGUN
Naval Strike and Air Warfare Center
No. 54 Squadron RAF

References

External links
 RAF About the Course
 UK CQWI
 54(R) Sqn
 Naval Aviation Warfighting Development Center
 USAF Weapons School

Military education and training in the United Kingdom
Ministry of Defence (United Kingdom)
Royal Navy
Royal Air Force